Acronacantha is a genus of flies in the family Tachinidae, containing only the species Acronacantha nubilipennis.

References

Tachinidae genera
Monotypic Brachycera genera
Taxa named by Frederik Maurits van der Wulp